Alex Espinoza is an American writer and educator, living in Los Angeles. He has written the novels Still Water Saints (2007) and The Five Acts of Diego León (2013), as well as Cruising: An Intimate History of a Radical Pastime (2019).

Life and work
Espinoza was born in Tijuana, Mexico and moved with his family to the United States at age two, growing up in suburban Los Angeles. He graduated from the University of California, Riverside, and earned an MFA from the University of California, Irvine's Program in Writing.

He teaches at the University of California, Riverside where he serves as the Tomás Rivera Endowed Chair of Creative Writing, and lives in Los Angeles.

Publications
Still Water Saints (Random House, 2007)
The Dream Within and Other Stories. Outskirts, 2008. .
The Five Acts of Diego León (Random House, 2013)
Cruising: An Intimate History of a Radical Pastime (Unnamed, 2019)

Awards
2014: American Book Award from the Before Columbus Foundation for The Five Acts of Diego León
2014: Fellowship in Prose from the National Endowment for the Arts
2019: MacDowell fellowship

References

External links

21st-century American male writers
Mexican gay writers
21st-century Mexican LGBT people
American gay writers
American people with disabilities
Writers with disabilities
People from Tijuana
University of California, Riverside faculty
University of California, Riverside alumni
University of California, Irvine alumni
MacDowell Colony fellows
Year of birth missing (living people)
Living people